There's Cake in My Future is a 2010 romantic comedy novel by Kim Gruenenfelder. Expanding upon the chick lit style that defined her bestseller A Total Waste of Makeup, the novel follows the lives of three friends Nic, Mel, and Seema after a future-changing cake pull. The series continues with the same characters after their fortunes have changed, with the sequel Keep Calm and Carry a Big Drink published in 2013.

Reception 
The book received generally favorable reviews from critics and audiences. Chick Lit Central praised the novel, recommending it to chick lit readers with comparisons to Friends and Sex and the City. Labeling the book a "gimmicky romp," Kirkus Reviews lauded the book for highlighting female characters who are "smart, likable and good to each other," though it criticized Gruenenfelder's use of one-liners.

References 

2010 American novels
St. Martin's Press books
Chick lit novels